1959 in Korea may refer to:
1959 in North Korea
1959 in South Korea